Devil's Highway is a 2005 American horror film directed by Fabien Pruvot, written by Jennifer Farrell, and starring Shane Brolly, Robert Miano, Al Sapienza, and Natassia Malthe as passengers on a bus who are targeted by a demon.

Plot summary
Roger, a thief, picks up a female hitchhiker.  Later, he boards a tour bus headed to Las Vegas; the woman is no longer with him.  Roger goes missing at the bus' first stop, and, thereafter, another passenger disappears at each stop.  The missing passengers are later revealed to be the victims of a demon that can jump from body to body, able to possess them at will.  As each character's back story and secrets are revealed, they are targeted by the demon.

Cast 
 Shane Brolly as Roger
 Robert Miano as Joe
 Al Sapienza as Hector
 Natassia Malthe as Michelle
 Sarah G. Buxton as Woman
 Corbin Timbrook as Father O'Connell
 Jennifer Farrell as Lisa
 Dayton Knoll as Scott
 Wilmer Calderon as Manuel
 Natalie Alexander as Edna
 Robert Ambrose as Charlie
 Kacia Brady as Randi
 Nicholas Pajon as Bob

Production
Devil's Highway was directed by Fabien Pruvot.

Release

Critical reception 

Jon Condit of Dread Central rated it 1/5 stars and wrote that it does not effectively use its "relatively interesting concept".  Serene Dominic of the Metro Times called it "part Dante's Inferno and part Murder on the Orient Express".  Thomas Spurlin of DVD Talk rated it 3/5 stars and wrote, "[T]he visual crispness and simple, character-driven plot within this eerie mystery makes this one worth a watch."

Accolades
Devil's Highway won best feature and best cinematography at the 2005 New York International Independent Film and Video Festival.

Home media
Image Entertainment released Devil's Highway on DVD on February 27, 2007.

References

External links 
 
 

2005 films
2005 horror films
American supernatural horror films
Demons in film
2000s English-language films
2000s American films